Mthonjaneni is an administrative area in the King Cetshwayo District of KwaZulu-Natal in South Africa.

Mthonjaneni is an isiZulu name meaning "a spring of water". There is a spring found in the vicinity of the municipality where King Dingaan used to send his maidens to collect water for him.

The municipality was enlarged at the time of the South African municipal election, 2016 when part of the disbanded Ntambanana Local Municipality was merged into it.

Main places
The 2001 census divided the municipality into the following main places:

Politics 

The municipal council consists of twenty-five members elected by mixed-member proportional representation. Thirteen councillors are elected by first-past-the-post voting in thirteen wards, while the remaining twelve are chosen from party lists so that the total number of party representatives is proportional to the number of votes received. In the election of 1 November 2021 the Inkatha Freedom Party (IFP) lost its majority, obtaining a plurality of twelve seats on the council.

The following table shows the results of the 2021 election.

References

External links
 http://www.mthonjaneni.org.za/

Local municipalities of the King Cetshwayo District Municipality